The 1975-76 American Basketball Association season saw the Virginia Squires finish in last place in the league, tying the record they set the year before for the worst record in ABA history.  The Squires' financial troubles led to their dissolution just after the end of the regular season.  As a result, the Squires were not part of the ABA-NBA merger that occurred at the conclusion of the season.

Offseason

Draft picks

Preseason transactions

 On July 14, 1975, the Squires traded George Irvine and the rights to David Thompson to the Denver Nuggets for Mike Green, Jan van Breda Kolff and Mack Calvin
 In July 1975 the Squires signed Mel Bennett and Ticky Burden

Preseason exhibition games

Like most ABA teams, the Squires played several preseason exhibition games against NBA opponents.

On October 1, 1975, the Squires lost to the Houston Rockets 117-112 in Norfolk.  On October 4, 1975, the Squires lost to the Philadelphia 76ers 130-113 in Hampton; in that game Squires star Mack Calvin tore a knee tendon, putting him out of action for two months.  On October 12, 1975, the Squires defeated the Chicago Bulls 105-102 in Norfolk; the Bulls later sued the Squires for failing to pay a $13,000 guarantee for the game.

Though the Squires were 1-2 against the NBA that year, the ABA finished 31-17 against the NBA that year.

Regular season

Roster

34   Mel Bennett
21  Mack Calvin
31  Mike Jackson
45  David Vaughn
1  Fatty Taylor
11  Bill Schaeffer
15  Ticky Burden
22  Mike Green
13  Dave Twardzik
42  Willie Wise
24  Joby Wright
32  Jan van Breda Kolff
25  Gerald Govan
33  Jim Eakins
10  Swen Nater

Season standings

Month by month

October 1975

The Squires opened the 1975-76 season on October 24, 1975, with a 112-101 loss at home in Norfolk to the Indiana Pacers; Indiana's Billy Knight led all players with 36 points.  Two nights later on the 26th the Squires lost in Louisville to the Kentucky Colonels, 130-112, despite Ticky Burden leading all scorers with 28.  On October 28 the Squires lost at home to the San Antonio Spurs 108-103 despite Willie Wise leading all scorers with 27; 3,949 attended.  On the 29th before 2,905 fans in Hampton the Squires lost in overtime to the Spirits of St. Louis, 104-100, despite Willie Wise again leading all scorers with 38.  On October 31 Virginia lost on the road to the Utah Stars, 123-116.  The Squires entered November with a record of 0-5.

November 1975

The Squires opened November with their first win of the season, a 109-105 road victory over the San Diego Sails in which Ticky Burden led all scorers with 45 points.  The following night the Squires lost on the road to the Spirits of St. Louis, 106-99.  On November 3, 1975, head coach Al Bianchi was fired after a 1-6 start.  Mack Calvin became the Squires player/coach on November 5, 1975.  The Squires next game was a 118-104 loss before 4,334 fans at home to the San Diego Sails on November 5; Ticky Burden scored 40 points in Mack Calvin's debut as the Virginia head coach. On the 7th in Hampton the Squires lost to the Indiana Pacers 104-100 before 3,293 fans.  On November 11 in Cincinnati the Squires lost to the Kentucky Colonels 128-106; Artis Gilmore, Louie Dampier and Johnny Neumann each scored 21.  The next night in San Antonio the Squires lost to the Spurs 144-112 despite Ticky Burden leading all scorers with 27.

After Calvin went 0-6 he was replaced by former San Diego Sails coach Bill Musselman on November 19, 1975.  Musselman went 4-22 before being replaced.

November 21 saw the Utah Stars visit the Squires, and the Squires won 106-98 in front of 7,292 fans in Norfolk as Ticky Burden tallied a game-high 34 points.

December 1975

January 1976

On January 7, 1976 Jim Eakins was traded to the New York Nets for Swen Nater and Bill Schaeffer  On January 17, 1976, the Squires traded Johnny Neumann and Jan van Breda Kolff to the Kentucky Colonels for Marv Roberts Jack Ankerson became head coach on January 21, 1976.  After compiling a 1-1 record he was replaced by Zelmo Beaty on January 23, 1976.  Beaty finished with a record of 9-33.

February 1976

The Squires closed February 1976 on the 28th with a 99-92 victory over the Indiana Pacers in Norfolk before 4,967 fans, and on the 29th with an overtime loss in St. Louis to the Spirits, 113-109, with St. Louis' Marvin Barnes  leading all scorers with 34 before 1,828 fans.

March 1976

April 1976

On April 2, 1976, despite Ticky Burden's game-high 28 points the Squires lost on the road to the Spirits of St. Louis, 110-109, before a crowd of only 1,388.  The next night the Squires won at home against the Indiana Pacers, 113-112, before 4,336 fans.  The next night, April 4, the Squires lost on the road against the New York Nets, 136-103, before 9,141 fans.  On April 6 the Squires won at home against the Spirits, 120-116, before 2,448 fans in their last game in Hampton.  The next night, April 7, 1976, the Squires lost their final game, 127-123, at home in Norfolk against the New York Nets; former Squire Julius Erving had a game-high 38 points for the Nets.

May 1976

On May 10, 1976, the Squires had failed to pay a $75,000 league assessment. On May 11, 1976, the Virginia Squires franchise was permanently disbanded.

June 1976

The ABA-NBA merger took place, but the disbanded Squires were excluded.

Records
The Squires ended the season with a record of 15 wins and 68 losses, putting them in last place.  They did not qualify for the playoffs.

Transactions

Draft and preseason signings

Trades and transactions

December 1, 1975: Jim Eakins of the Utah Stars is sold to the Virginia Squires
On January 7, 1976 Jim Eakins was traded to the New York Nets for Swen Nater and Bill Schaeffer
On January 17, 1976, the Squires traded Johnny Neumann and Jan van Breda Kolff to the Kentucky Colonels for Marv Roberts

References

External links 
Remember the ABA Virginia Squires page
Remember the ABA Virginia Squires Year to Year Notes

Virginia
Virginia Squires
Virginia Squires
Virginia Squires